International air travel from the United Kingdom refers to the commercial carriage of passengers between the UK and the rest of the world. In 2008, London Heathrow Airport which is also the busiest international airport on Earth handled 67,054,745 passengers which is more than the total population of the United Kingdom. The 20 busiest airports in the UK handled close to 230 million passengers in 2008 (185 million of whom were international passengers). The geographical size of the UK means that many flights that would be considered domestic in for example the United States are actually international (i.e. the distance from Heathrow to Charles de Gaulle Airport is roughly the same as the distance between John F. Kennedy International Airport and Washington Dulles International Airport). The London airports, Heathrow, Gatwick and Stansted alongside Manchester Airport rank amongst the world's busiest airports by international passenger traffic. According to 2008 statistics the best served nations by direct flights from the UK were France, Italy, Spain, the United States and Germany with 50, 34, 33, 31 and 29 respectively. Overall Spain was the nation that saw the most passengers arrive from the UK in 2008, with a total of 34,557,729 (almost double the number that flew to the United States)

The table below shows the number of international passengers who travelled out of all UK airports in 2008 and to which countries.

References

Aviation in the United Kingdom